Dmitrii Andreevich Gudkov (1918–1992; alternative spelling Dmitry) was a Soviet mathematician famous for his work on Hilbert's sixteenth problem and the related Gudkov's conjecture in algebraic geometry. He was a student of Aleksandr Andronov.

Selected papers
D. A. Gudkov, "The topology of real projective algebraic varieties", Russian Mathematical Surveys, 1974, 29 (4), pp. 1–79 (translated from the Russian original).
D. A. Gudkov "Periodicity of the Euler characteristic of real algebraic (M—1)-manifolds", Functional Analysis and Its Applications, April–June, 1973, Volume 7, Issue 2, pp. 98–102 (translated from the Russian original).
D.A Gudkov. "Ovals of sixth order curves". in the book Nine Papers on Hilbert's 16th Problem American Mathematical Society 112, pp. 9–14 (translated from the Russian original).

References

Soviet mathematicians
1918 births
1992 deaths
Algebraic geometers